"Beatsound Loverboy" is a song by Slimmy, released in 2007 as the lead single from his debut album Beatsound Loverboy. The song peaked at number 42 in the Portugal Singles Chart.
The song also appeared on the soundtrack to Morangos com Açúcar soap opera.

Background
"Beatsound Loverboy" was unveiled as the album's lead single. The song was written by Slimmy and produced by Quico Serrano and Mark Turner. It was released to MySpace on 1 January 2007 and was released as digital single on September 6, 2011. "Beatsound Loverboy" was part of the soundtrack of the 5th season of the Portuguese soap opera Morangos com Açúcar (Slimmy played this song in the last episode).

Music video

The video starts with a girl dancing to the song in a room, while Slimmy is watching her through a laptop. After this, the scene changes and shows several performances of Slimmy performing the song while wearing different outfits. Than, the scene changes again and shows Slimmy arriving to an abandoned factory and see two girls sleeping on a sofa. This scene is then alternated with the performance scene. After this, we see Slimmy returning to his laptop to observe the girl he was watching at the beginning of the video. The rest of the video shows the performance scene alternated with the factory scene. The video ends with a scene identical to the opening one.

Chart performance
The song entered at number 46 on the Portugal Singles Top 50 where it stayed for four weeks and came to peak at number 42 where it stayed for more two weeks.

Live performances
 Morangos com Açúcar - last episode
 Sex and Love Tour
 A Very Slimmy Tour
 Be Someone Else Tour

Track listing
MySpace promotional single
"Beatsound Loverboy" (album version) - 3:03

Digital single
"Beatsound Loverboy" (album version) - 3:03

Personnel
Taken from the album's booklet.

Paulo Fernandes – main vocals, guitar
Paulo Garim – bass
Tó-Zé – drums

Release history

Charts

References

External links
Official music video at YouTube.

2007 singles
English-language Portuguese songs
2006 songs